Big Sandy Creek is a  tributary of the Arkansas River noted for being the location of the Sand Creek Massacre in Kiowa County.  Long stretches are dry most of the time on the surface, although water still flows underground.  Big Sandy Creek starts near Peyton in El Paso County, Colorado and flows through Elbert, Lincoln, Cheyenne and Kiowa counties before it joins with the Arkansas River in Prowers county east of Lamar.

See also
List of rivers of Colorado

References

Rivers of Colorado
Tributaries of the Arkansas River
Rivers of El Paso County, Colorado
Rivers of Elbert County, Colorado
Rivers of Lincoln County, Colorado
Rivers of Cheyenne County, Colorado
Rivers of Kiowa County, Colorado
Rivers of Prowers County, Colorado